Henry Clay Miner (March 23, 1842 – February 22, 1900) was an American theatrical impresario and politician who served one as a U.S. Representative from New York from 1895 to 1897.

Biography
Born in New York City, Miner attended the public schools, and worked as a clerk in drug stores while learning the pharmacy business. In addition, Miner studied medicine under his brother, Dr. Edward Miner, then president of the Brooklyn Medical College, and attended the Institute of Physicians and Surgeons, an alternative healing school in New York City. Miner became a pharmacist, and during the American Civil War he served as pharmacist of the 1st New York Volunteer Engineer Regiment during its mobilization and training on Long Island.  Miner also worked as a police officer, and became a volunteer fireman.

Business career 
Miner's pharmacy business expanded until he incorporated the H. C. Miner Company, which operated multiple stores, and was also a wholesale supplier of toiletries and merchandise to other drug stores. In 1864, Miner became interested in the theatrical business after working as an advance man for a traveling medical lecturer. He eventually owned five theaters in New York City and Newark, New Jersey, and his chain expanded to additional locations, including Detroit, Michigan. Miner was also president of a lithographing company, which produced advertising and posters for his theatrical productions, and he was publisher of the American Dramatic Directory, and president of the Actors' Fund Association. In addition, he possessed ownership stakes in banks, real estate, railroads, and other ventures.

Congress 
Miner was elected as a Democrat to the 54th Congress (March 4, 1895 – March 3, 1897). He was not a candidate for renomination in 1896.

Death and burial 
He died in New York City February 22, 1900. He was interred in Green-Wood Cemetery in Brooklyn, New York.

At his death, Clay's net worth was more than $5 million (more than $146 million in 2017). His assets were controlled by the Estate of Henry C. Miner, Incorporated, of which his son Henry C. Miner Jr. was president.

Family
Miner was married twice; his first wife was Julia Lucinda Moore (d. 1894), with whom he had four sons, Henry C., Edwin D., Thomas W., and George H. His second wife was Annie O'Neill, an actress who retired after their marriage. With his second wife, Miner was the father of a son, John.

See also
Miner's Bowery Theatre

References

Sources

Newspapers

Books

External sources

1842 births
1900 deaths
Burials at Green-Wood Cemetery
Democratic Party members of the United States House of Representatives from New York (state)
19th-century American politicians
Vaudeville producers